The 32nd Ryder Cup Matches were held at the Valderrama Golf Club in Sotogrande, Spain, marking the first time the event was contested in continental Europe. The European team won the competition by a margin of 14 to 13 and retained the Ryder Cup.

The Europeans held a 10–5 lead heading into the final day, but the Americans mounted a comeback by winning the singles matches 8–4 but fell just short.  Colin Montgomerie halved the final match with Scott Hoch (conceding a  par putt on the final hole) to seal the outright victory for the Europeans.

This was the first of six consecutive victories at home by Europe, a streak that remains intact through 2018.

Format
The Ryder Cup is a match play event, with each match worth one point.  The competition format used in 1997 was as follows:
Day 1 (Friday) — 4 fourball (better ball) matches in a morning session and 4 foursome (alternate shot) matches in an afternoon session
Day 2 (Saturday) — 4 fourball matches in a morning session and 4 foursome matches in an afternoon session
Day 3 (Sunday) — 12 singles matches
With a total of 28 points, 14 points were required to win the Cup, and 14 points were required for the defending champion to retain the Cup.  All matches were played to a maximum of 18 holes.

Teams
The selection process for the European team remained largely unchanged from that used in 1995 with two captain's picks. If captain Ballesteros qualified automatically, he had the choice of standing down and selecting a third player. The qualifying period remained the same, starting with the Canon European Masters in Switzerland at the beginning of September 1996 and ending with the BMW International Open on 31 August, the remaining two team members being chosen soon afterwards by the team captain. Prior to the final event Miguel Ángel Martín was in 10th place in the points list. He had, however, not played since The Open Championship because of a wrist injury. In the final event both José María Olazábal and Pádraig Harrington had chances to overtake Martin but neither succeeded. Olazábal finished 11th in the final points list with Harrington 12th. Because of uncertainty about Martin's fitness, the announcement of the two captain's picks, which was to have been immediately after the BMW International Open, was cancelled. On the Tuesday Martin was given an ultimatum that he was required to play 18 holes the following day to demonstrate that he would be fit to play in the Ryder Cup. Martin refused and was replaced by Olazábal, who had finished in the next qualifying place. Ballesteros announced his wildcards on the Thursday, choosing Nick Faldo and Jesper Parnevik. Miguel Ángel Martín had a world ranking of 79 at the time of the Ryder Cup.

Captains picks are shown in yellow; the world rankings and records are at the start of the 1997 Ryder Cup.

Captains picks are shown in yellow; the world rankings and records are at the start of the 1997 Ryder Cup.

Friday's matches

Morning four-ball

Afternoon foursomes

Saturday's matches

Morning four-ball

Afternoon foursomes

Sunday's singles matches

Individual player records
Each entry refers to the win–loss–half record of the player.

Source:

Europe

United States

References

Ryder Cup
Golf tournaments in Spain
Ryder Cup
Ryder Cup
Ryder Cup